Martin Donovan (born Martin Paul Smith; August 19, 1957) is an American actor. He has had a long collaboration with director Hal Hartley, appearing in many of his films, such as Trust (1990), Surviving Desire (1991), Simple Men (1992), Amateur (1994), Flirt (1995), and The Book of Life (1998), starring as Jesus Christ in the latter. Donovan played Tom Gordon in Ghost Whisperer. Donovan also played Peter Scottson on Showtime's cable series Weeds. He made his writing/directorial debut with the film Collaborator (2011). Donovan played Detective Hap Eckhart in Christopher Nolan's psychological thriller Insomnia (2002) and the Protagonist's CIA handler, Fay, in Nolan's science fiction action thriller film Tenet (2020).

Early life
Donovan was born Martin Paul Smith in Reseda, California. 

He graduated from Crespi Carmelite High School and attended Pierce College for two years. He attended American Theater Arts, a combined conservatory and theater company in Los Angeles, where he appeared in the plays Richard's Cork Leg by Brendan Behan and Private Life of the Master Race by Bertold Brecht. In 1983, he and his future wife, Vivian, moved to New York City. He joined the off-off-Broadway Cucaracha Theater on Greenwich Street.

Career
Donovan has appeared in fourteen episodes of the Showtime television series Weeds, which stars Mary-Louise Parker, for which he was nominated for a SAG Award for Outstanding Performance by An Ensemble in a Comedy Series. He has also acted with Parker in Saved!, Pipe Dream and The Portrait of a Lady. For the latter film, he won the National Society of Film Critics' Award for best supporting actor.

Personal life
Donovan married actress Vivian Lanko in 1984; they have two sons. They lived in New York City for many years before relocating to Vancouver.

Filmography

Film

Television

References

External links
 

1957 births
20th-century American male actors
21st-century American male actors
American emigrants to Canada
American male film actors
American male stage actors
American male television actors
living people
male actors from Los Angeles
people from Reseda, Los Angeles